Hypatima instaurata is a moth in the family Gelechiidae. It was described by Edward Meyrick in 1921. It is found on Java in Indonesia.

The wingspan is about 14 mm. The forewings are whitish ochreous, more ochreous tinged on the basal half and with a small black dot towards the costa near the base, as well as a dark brown triangular blotch becoming blackish towards the posterior angle extending on the costa over the median third and reaching halfway across the wing, preceded on the costa by a small lighter brownish elongate spot. There is some irregular light brownish suffusion towards the costa posteriorly and an indistinct irregular brownish line along the termen, with cloudy blackish apical and subapical dots. The hindwings are grey, thinly scaled anteriorly.

References

Hypatima
Taxa named by Edward Meyrick
Moths described in 1921